Kangarlu (also Romanized as Kangarlū) is a village in Qanibeyglu Rural District, Zanjanrud District, Zanjan County, Zanjan Province, Iran. At the 2006 census, its population was 198, in 38 families.

References 

Populated places in Zanjan County